Into the Mountain is the eighth studio album by Astrid Williamson, released on 18 February 2022 on Incarnation Records. Williamson created the album's songs from a cache of poetry sand writing she discovered on a computer hard drive.

Critical reception

PopMatters praised "the honed songwriting, the textures, the storytelling and the heaven bound, singular voice" with The Scotsman saying "the rolling drums, windswept strings and incantatory vocals whip up an atmospheric folk pop storm". Uncut stated that "it taps feelings of regret, loss, yearning & desire but acceptance too".

Track listing 
All songs are written by Astrid Williamson.
 "Coming Up for Air" – 3:36
 "In Gratitude" – 5:20
 "Eat" – 3:14
 "June Bug" – 6:03
 "Body" – 3:58
 "For Henry" – 4:26
 "Prague" – 3:57
 "Corsica" – 6:01
 "Gun" – 5:26
 "There Are Words" – 3:11

Personnel 

 Astrid Williamson – vocals, synthesisers, piano, xylophone, guitar, organ, programming & string arrangements
 Andy Glen – guitar, percussion, e-bow, string arrangements, backing vocals
 Martyn Barker – drums & percussion
 Nicolas Dick – lap steel guitar
 Richard Yale – bass guitar
 Ruth Gottlieb – violin

Production
 Andy Glen – producer
 Tula Parker – artwork

References 

2022 albums
Astrid Williamson albums